Muzaffargarh railway station is situated at Muzaffargarh, Pakistan. This railway station was constructed in January 22, 1887.

See also
 List of railway stations in Muzaffargarh
 List of railway stations in Pakistan
 Pakistan Railways

References

External links
Muzaffargarh Railways Station Train Schedule 

Muzaffargarh
Transport in Muzaffargarh
Railway stations in Muzaffargarh District
Railway stations on Sher Shah–Kot Addu Branch Line
Buildings and structures in Muzaffargarh